National Road 124 is a national road of Cambodia. At Khum Srang the road connects with National Road 125 which leads directly north-west to Kampong Speu.

The road continues south passing through Prey Chek District before joining National Highway 3 several kilometres west of Dam Thnam.

References 

Roads in Cambodia